This page gathers the results of elections in Franche-Comté.

Regional elections

Last regional election

In the last regional election, which took place on March 21 and March 28, 2004, Raymond Forni (PS) was elected President, defeating incumbent Jean-François Humbert (UMP).